Etienne-Benjamin Deschauffours (1690 – 24 May 1726) was a French procurer. He was executed by burning for homosexuality on Place de Grève in Paris after having acted as a pimp of male prostitutes, some of which were underage boys whom he kidnapped, one of whom he are suspected of having murdered.

He were responsible for having prostituted about 200 males to male aristocrats, clerics and noblemen, and his arrested and trials were delayed a long time to avoid scandal, during which he was imprisoned in the Bastille, before he was finally put on trial. His trial were a famous case in his time and attracted a lot of attention.

References  

French pimps
18th-century French businesspeople
18th-century executions by France
1690 births
1726 deaths
People executed by France by burning
18th-century LGBT people
People prosecuted under anti-homosexuality laws